Sod Buster Ballads is a 1941 album by the Almanac Singers: Woody Guthrie, Millard Lampell, Lee Hays and Pete Seeger.  The songs are:

Track listing

References 

Almanac Singers albums
1941 albums
Albums produced by Alan Lomax